Henry Hutchinson Montgomery (3 October 184725 November 1932) was an Anglican bishop and author.

Family and education
He was born in 1847 at Cawnpore, India, the second son of the colonial administrator Robert Montgomery, Lieutenant Governor of the Punjab. The Montgomerys were an Anglo-Irish gentry family from Inishowen in the north of  County Donegal in Ulster. Henry was educated at Harrow School and Trinity College, Cambridge. Writing on 16 March 1944, G. M. Trevelyan observed that Montgomery was one of the few people ever to have jumped up the college steps in one bound.

Early ministry and marriage
Made a deacon on Trinity Sunday 1871 (4 June) and ordained a priest the following Trinity Sunday (26 May 1872) — both times by Richard Durnford, Bishop of Chichester, at Chichester Cathedral; Montgomery took curacies at Hurstpierpoint and St. Margaret's, Westminster. The Archdeacon at Westminster was Frederic William Farrar. Montgomery became engaged to Farrar's daughter Maud when she was 14 and they married two years later, at Westminster Abbey on 28 July 1881 one of their five sons was Bernard "Monty", who became a field marshal and later 1st Viscount Montgomery of Alamein.

On 21 July 1879, he became Vicar of St Mark's Kennington. From here he was appointed to be Bishop of Tasmania in 1889, where he nearly doubled the number of churches in the diocese. He was consecrated a bishop at Westminster Abbey on 1 May 1889 by Edward White Benson, Archbishop of Canterbury; and resigned the See effective 7 November 1901.

After India
In 1901 he was recalled to Britain to be secretary of the Society for the Propagation of the Gospel in Foreign Parts (SPG). Arthur Winnington-Ingram, Bishop of London, appointed him to the prebendal stall of Wenlocksbarn in St Paul's Cathedral in October 1902. Appointments to the prebendal stalls of St Paul's gave voting rights in the Great Chapter of the church and carried an income, but was otherwise an honorary position. In 1905 he was appointed Prelate of the Order of St Michael and St George; and was raised to the rank of Knight Commander (KCMG) in the 1928 King's Birthday Honours.

In 1887 he inherited New Park, his father's country house and estate, at Moville in Inishowen, County Donegal. Described in his Times obituary as a man "always young in enthusiasm and open vision", he died at home on 25 November 1932 and was buried in Moville churchyard.

As mentioned above, he was father of the World War II leader "Monty". Other descendants include Canadian author Charles Montgomery, who wrote a 2004 travel memoir in the steps of his great-grandfather, The Last Heathen: Encounters with Ghosts and Ancestors in Melanesia.

Works
[https://books.google.com/books?id=LH9lAAAAMAAJ and the Church: Being an Attempt to Estimate the Contribution of Great Races to the Fulness of the Church of God], 1907Life's Journey, 1916Life of Bishop Lefroy, 1920
Project Canterbury, Charles John Corfe, Naval Chaplain - Bishop, 1927Joy of the Lord, 1931Old Age'', 1932

Notes

External links
Photograph of Montgomery
His papers held at Lambeth Palace Library 

1847 births
People educated at Harrow School
Alumni of Trinity College, Cambridge
Anglican bishops of Tasmania
Knights Commander of the Order of St Michael and St George
1932 deaths
People from Kanpur
English cricketers
Cambridge University cricketers
Marylebone Cricket Club cricketers
Southgate cricketers
Clan Montgomery